The East Lancs Lolyne is a type of double-decker bus body built by East Lancs. It is the double-decker version of the Spryte. It continued the long line of 'misspelt' names which continued until the Scania OmniDekka. It was built on the Dennis Trident 2 twin-axle low-floor bus chassis and it can be built as either a closed top bus or an open-top bus.

Myllennium Lolyne 

The facelifted East Lancs Myllennium Lolyne superseded the original Lolyne in 2002.

The structure of the Myllennium Lolyne was built using the Alusuisse "System M5438" system, for optimum strength. Glazing was with laminated glass, and gasket glazing came with the bus as standard - with bonded glazing available - and had hopper opening windows. The heating was thermostatically controlled and windows and air vents provided ventilation.

The seating was trimmed in customer's required moquette. The floor had a 12mm Xyligen Basileum treated Finnish Birch combi plywood floor on the lower deck and both decks a non-slip flooring.

Electrical features were the fluorescent light on the bus' ceilings, and twin circular halogen headlights. Also, CCTV was available. Destination displays only came as manual as standard, doors were air operated and were made of toughened glass. A simple driver's compartment was designed, to make the driver's job easier. Two pack acrylic paint was available for the exterior.

Gallery

See also 

 List of buses

Competitors
 Alexander ALX400
 Plaxton President

References

External links

East Lancashire Coachbuilders
Dennis

Double-decker buses
Low-floor buses
Open-top buses
Lolyne